Lucapinella henseli is a species of sea snail, a marine gastropod mollusk in the family Fissurellidae, the keyhole limpets and slit limpets.

Description
The size of the shell varies between 9 mm and 30 mm.

Distribution
This species occurs in the Atlantic Ocean from Brazil to the Straits of Magellan.

References

 Pérez Farfante, I. 1943. The genera Fissurella, Lucapina and Lucapinella in the Western Atlantic. Johnsonia 1(10): 1-20

External links
 To Biodiversity Heritage Library (1 publication)
 To Encyclopedia of Life
 To ITIS
 To World Register of Marine Species
 

Fissurellidae
Gastropods described in 1900